The men's 800 metre freestyle competition at the 1997 Pan Pacific Swimming Championships took place on August 10 at the NISHI Civic Pool.  The last champion was Daniel Kowalski of Australia.

This event was a timed-final where each swimmer swam just once.

Records
Prior to this competition, the existing world and Pan Pacific records were as follows:

Results
All times are in minutes and seconds.

References

1997 Pan Pacific Swimming Championships